Îlet à Cabrit, officially French: îlet à Cabrit des Saintes (literally: Goat Island of Les Saintes), is an island in the Îles des Saintes, Guadeloupe, the Lesser Antilles. It belongs to the commune of Terre-de-Haut.

Geography

By its localization, Îlet à Cabrit creates two passages into the Bay of les Saintes, la Baleine passage to the East and Pain de Sucre passage in the South, which constitute both access roads to the harbours of Mouillage and Fond-du-Curé.

History
The strategic position of Petite Martinique (former name of Îlet à Cabrit) always served of sentinel's place. In 1777, France built, at the top of Morne de la Reine hill (Former name of Morne Josephine hill), a fortification named Fort de la Reine renamed later Fort Joséphine. It formed then a defensive system with the Fort Napoléon and the numerous battery of the archipelago.

The British, who occupied les Saintes in 1809, kept Fort Joséphine and added water butt to it. After the return of les Saintes under French dominion, Fort Joséphine became a penitentiary from 1851, but it was ravaged by a hurricane, on September 6, 1865. It continued however to welcome convicts on the way towards Îles du Salut, in French Guiana until 1902.

In 1871, Îlet à Cabrit became a place of quarantine: a lazaretto, was opened instead of the penitentiary.

Notes and references

External links

Uninhabited islands of Îles des Saintes